Tanner Putt (born April 21, 1992) is an American cyclist, who currently rides for American amateur team .

Major results

2009
 1st  Overall Tour of Belize
2010
 2nd Road race, National Junior Road Championships
2012
 1st Stage 8a Vuelta a la Independencia Nacional
 2nd Road race, National Under-23 Road Championships
 10th La Côte Picarde
2013
 1st  Road race, National Under-23 Road Championships
2014
 1st  Road race, National Under-23 Road Championships
 9th Liège–Bastogne–Liège U23
 10th Overall Volta ao Alentejo
1st  Young rider classification
2015
 7th Ronde van Drenthe
 8th Le Samyn
2016
 1st Stage 2 Tour of Alberta
2017
 8th Overall Tour du Maroc
1st Stage 1
2019
 7th Winston-Salem Cycling Classic

References

External links

1992 births
Living people
American male cyclists